An alvar is a biological environment based on a limestone plain with thin or no soil and, as a result, sparse grassland vegetation. Often flooded in the spring, and affected by drought in midsummer, alvars support a distinctive group of prairie-like plants.  Most alvars occur either in northern Europe or around the Great Lakes in North America.  This stressed habitat supports a community of rare plants and animals, including species more commonly found on prairie grasslands. Lichen and mosses are common species. Trees and bushes are absent or severely stunted. 

The primary cause of alvars is the shallow exposed bedrock. Flooding and drought, as noted, add to the stress of the site and prevent many species from growing.  Disturbance may also play a role.  In Europe, grazing is frequent, while in North America, there is some evidence that fire may also prevent encroachment by forest.  The habitat also has strong competition gradients, with better competitors occupying the deeper soil and excluding other species to less productive locations. Crevices in the limestone provide a distinctive habitat which is somewhat protected from grazing, and which may provide habitat for unusual ferns such as Pellaea atropurpurea. Bare rock flats provide areas with extremely low competition that serve as refugia for weak competitors such as the sandwort Minuartia michauxii and Micranthes virginiensis.  In a representative set of four Ontario alvars, seven habitat types were described.  From deep to shallow soil these were: tall grassy meadows, tall forb-rich meadows, low grassy meadows, low forb-rich meadows, dry grassland, rock margin grassland and bare rock flats. 

Alvars comprise a small percentage of the Earth's ecosystems by land extent. Although some 120 exist in the Great Lakes region, in total there are only about  left across the entire Great Lakes basin, and many of these have been degraded by agriculture and other human uses. More than half of all remaining alvars occur in Ontario.  There are smaller areas in New York, Michigan, Ohio, Wisconsin and Quebec.

In North America, alvars provide habitat for birds such as bobolinks, eastern meadowlarks, upland sandpipers, eastern towhees, brown thrashers and loggerhead shrikes whose habitat is declining elsewhere. Rare plants include Kalm's lobelia (Lobelia kalmii), Pringle's aster (Symphyotrichum pilosum var. pringlei), juniper sedge (Carex juniperorum), lakeside daisy (Hymenoxys acaulis), ram's-head lady's-slipper (Cypripedium arietinum), and dwarf lake iris (Iris lacustris). Also associated with alvars are rare butterflies and snails. The use of the word "alvar" to refer to this type of environment originated in Sweden. The largest alvar in Europe is located on the Swedish island of Öland. Here the thin soil mantle is only 0.5 to 2.0 centimeters thick in most places and in many extents consists of exposed limestone slabs.  The landscape there has been designated a UNESCO World Heritage Site. There are other more local names for similar landforms, such as a pavement barren, although this term is also used for similar landforms based on sandstone. In the United Kingdom the exposed landform is called a limestone pavement and thinly covered limestone is known as calcareous grassland.

European alvar locations
Sweden
Öland – Stora Alvaret – largest alvar extent in Europe
Gotland
Västergötland – several locations on limestone mountain Kinnekulle, smaller fragments on Falbygden, e.g. in Dala and Högstena parishes
Estonia
 Alvars are distributed along the whole northern coast of Estonia from approx. the town of Paldiski to Sillamäe, wherever limestone comes to the surface near the seashore (see Baltic Klint), as well as on the islands of the West Estonian archipelago. Estonia used to be home to approximately one third of the world's alvars; however, the total area of alvars has decreased from 43,000 hectares in the 1930s to 12,000 hectares in 2000, and approximately 9,000 hectares in 2010. Estonian alvars are home to 267 species of vascular plants, approximately one fifth of which are protected. There are also 142 species of bryophytes and 263 species of lichens. The Estonian government has committed itself to protect at least 9,800 hectares of the country's alvars as part of the Natura 2000 network. The Loopealse subdistrict of Tallinn is named after alvar.
Vardi Nature Reserve in Rapla County is an Estonian nature reserve especially designated to protect one of the more representative alvar areas of Estonia.
England
Cumbria and North Yorkshire – under protection in the UK Biodiversity Action Plan
Ireland
The Burren, a large alvar in northwest County Clare

Some North American alvar locations

The rare Charitable Research Reserve – Cambridge, Ontario
Lake Erie
Kelley's Island, Ohio – North Shore Alvar State Nature Preserve
Marblehead, Ohio – mostly destroyed by limestone quarrying
Pelee Island, Ontario – Stone Road Alvar Nature Reserve
Lake Huron
Maxton Plains Proposed Natural Area, Drummond Island, Michigan
Belanger Bay Alvar, Manitoulin Island, Ontario
Quarry Bay Nature Reserve, Manitoulin Island, Ontario
Bruce Alvar Nature Reserve, Bruce Peninsula, Ontario
Baptise Harbour Nature Reserve, Bruce Peninsula, Ontario
Misery Bay Provincial Park, Manitoulin Island, Ontario
Lake Michigan
Red Banks Alvar, Red Banks, Brown County, Wisconsin
Lake Ontario
Carden Plain Alvar, City of Kawartha Lakes, Ontario, including Carden Alvar Provincial Park
Chaumont Barrens Preserve, New York
Three Mile Creek Barrens, New York
Burnt Lands Alvar, Almonte, Ontario
Balsam Lake Indian Point Provincial Park, Ontario
Quebec
Quyon
Alvar d'Aylmer
Manitoba
Interlake

See also

References

External links

 http://www.epa.gov/ecopage/shore/alvars/

Alkaline soils
Habitats
Landforms
Types of soil
Alpine flora
Gotland
Geography of Gotland County